Rio Grande Raiders is a 1946 American Western film directed by Thomas Carr and written by Norton S. Parker. The film stars Sunset Carson, Linda Stirling, Bob Steele, Tom London, Tristram Coffin and Edmund Cobb. It was released on September 9, 1946 by Republic Pictures.

Plot

Cast  
Sunset Carson as Sunset Carson
Linda Stirling as Nancy Harding
Bob Steele as Jeff Carson
Tom London as Sheriff Tom Hammon
Tristram Coffin as Marc Redmond
Edmund Cobb as Frank Harding
Jack O'Shea as Henchman Ramsey
Tex Terry as Mac McLane
Kenne Duncan as Henchman Steve

References

External links 
 

1946 films
American Western (genre) films
1946 Western (genre) films
Republic Pictures films
Films directed by Thomas Carr
American black-and-white films
1940s English-language films
1940s American films